Alice in Wonder Underground (アリス イン ワンダー アンダーグラウンド) is the twenty-sixth single released by the Japanese Rock band Buck Tick, released on August 8, 2007.

Track listing

Musicians

Atsushi Sakurai - Voice
Hisashi Imai - Guitar
Hidehiko Hoshino - Guitar
Yutaka Higuchi - Bass
Toll Yagami - Drums

References

2007 singles
Buck-Tick songs
2007 songs
Ariola Japan singles
Songs with music by Hisashi Imai